Mizureh (also Romanized as Mīzūreh) is a village in Jastun Shah Rural District, Hati District, Lali County, Khuzestan Province, Iran. At the 2006 census, its population was 66, in 10 families.

References 

Populated places in Lali County